"?" is the oldest, still operational traditional tavern in Belgrade, Serbia. Located at 6 Kralja Petra Street, the building is nearly 200 years old. One of the city's best known landmarks, "?" offers traditional Balkan cuisine with starogradska music being played there.

History

19th century 

It was built by the diplomat and merchant Naum Ičko (son of Petar Ičko), on orders and with funds provided by the Prince of Serbia Miloš Obrenović I. Ičko was son of Petar Ičko, a noted diplomat. It was designed by an unnamed Greek architect and was built by the builders from Greece, which is commemorated by the inscription on the wall above the preserved, old table from this period. Later Prince Miloš awarded it to his personal doctor Toma Kostić known as Ećim Toma for his efforts during the Second Serbian Uprising.

So, as a temporary solution, the tavern's owner put a question mark on the door, and it soon became the official name of the place. For a while, out of respect for the nearby church, smoking was prohibited inside the tavern, but this didn't last.

20th century 

In the post-World War II period, the bistro was still owned by Ivan Pavlović, but communist Yugoslav authorities nationalized the property in 1959, ultimately placing it under the administration of the state owned company UTP Varoš Kapija in 1962. Sometime during the next thirty years it was declared a heritage spot and given landmark protection by the City of Belgrade's Landmark Office (Zavod za zaštitu spomenika grada Beograda).

"?" was added to the Protected Monuments of Culture list by the Republic of Serbia in 1981.

21st century 

Talk of re-privatizing the previously nationalized property first started in 2003. Then the tender auction of UTP Varoš Kapija, which administered tavern "?" was scheduled for 25 November 2004. The starting value of the property was set at €2,500 per square meter. Ultimately, the tender was annulled as the building, in which the restaurant is located, is protected by the state since 1946 and, as such, cannot become a private property.

Strong resistance from the tavern's employees, from various public figures (mostly journalists who frequented the bistro), and from some civil groups, paid off in February 2007 when the Government of Serbia decided to exempt the restaurant from the privatization process and signed it over to city administration as a heritage spot.  A petition, signed by 2,563 people, called for the privatization to be stopped.

In May 2017, the Serbian Ministry of Finance confirmed the earlier Agency for Restitution's decision to award the ownership of "?" to the descendants of Ivan Pavlovic, the property's owner from 1892 until 1959 when the property got nationalized. One of the descendants said that they do not plan to change the purpose of the building but that he cannpt guarantee that one of them will decide otherwise. The company filed a complaint asking for the annulment of the decision, claiming it has legally paid for the premises, partially to the state and partially to the descendants. In July 2019 the Administrative Court rejected the complaint, thus making the decision of restitution to the previous owners final. Initially, the owners refused to disclose what would happen with the venue.

Exterior 

The house was built in Balkan manner by “the Greek builders”. It was constructed in “bondruk” manner, with asymmetrically built interior and two bay windows on the main façade. It has a basement, ground floor and upper storey. It is situated toward the street and the lot depth occupies a garden and a yard. The basement was built from bricks and it has two massive vaults of 6 × 12m. The ground floor is arranged asymmetrically, consisting of three 4 × 9m, 2.5 × 4.5m and 7 × 7m chambers. The upper storey has six chambers: large 9 × 3m hall, two 5 × 5m symmetrically positioned rooms, forming bay windows over viewing the street, a 3.5 × 4m room and a 4 × 3m kitchen, with auxiliary room of 2.5 × 2.5m. Arrangement of rooms has remained unchanged despite of certain later partition works in the ground floor.

Gallery

References

External links 

 (Inter)National restaurants — list of traditional restaurants by Tourist Organization of Belgrade
 "?" nije pod znakom pitanja — article on privatization of restaurant 
 "?"@TripAdvisor
 "?"@Foursquare

 

Culture in Belgrade
Buildings and structures in Belgrade
Restaurants in Serbia
Houses completed in 1823
Protected Monuments of Culture
Landmarks in Serbia